Krishnapatnam railway station (station code:KAPT), is an Indian Railways station in Krishnapatnam of Nellore district in the state of Andhra Pradesh. It is a non-coaching traffic handling station and is mainly utilized for freight transport from Krishnapatnam Port. It is situated on Obulavaripalle–Krishnapatnam section of Vijayawada railway division of South Coast Railway zone.

See also 
List of railway stations in India

References 

Railway stations in Krishna district
Vijayawada railway division